Apolobesia is a genus of moths belonging to family Tortricidae.

Species
Apolobesia nsukka
Apolobesia sitophaga (Meyrick, 1922)

See also
List of Tortricidae genera

References

External links
Tortricid.net

Tortricidae genera
Olethreutinae
Taxa named by Alexey Diakonoff